Richardia grandiflora, the largeflower Mexican clover, largeflower pusley, or Florida snow, is a species of flowering plant native to Brazil, Bolivia, Paraguay, Uruguay, and northeastern Argentina. It is in the Rubiaceae family. Used as a ground cover, it has proliferated in Florida.

See also
Richardia scabra

References

Spermacoceae
Flora of Bolivia
Flora of Brazil
Flora of Northeast Argentina
Flora of Paraguay
Flora of Uruguay